The Soling is an open keelboat that holds the World Sailing "International class" status. The class was used from the 1972 Olympics (Kiel) until the 2000 Olympics (Sydney) as "Open Three Person Keelboat". Besides the Olympic career of the Soling the boat is used for International and local regattas as well as for recreational sailing. The Soling is managed by the International Soling Association under auspician of World Sailing/ISAF/IYRU since 1968. 

The Soling is a strong boat designed for any wind and sea condition by Jan Herman Linge from Norway in 1964. The boats are one-design originating from an authorized single plug and mould system and made of fiberglass. This together with a strict set of class rules makes competition possible on a "level playing field". Solings last a long time, and boats produced in the early days are still in competition today (more than 50 years after being built). At the 2019 North American Championship the fifth place was taken by the German team sailing a refurbished Soling which had been built in 1968. A characteristic sailing style for the Soling is the droop-hiking technique.

History of the Soling

Solings Built
Over the years about 4500 Solings were built. About 3700 of them were registered. The growth in the late 1960s and early 1970s was high. Then it stabilized. Since 2000 hardly any boats were built.

Over the years the following 36 boat builders in 21 countries were licensed to built Solings:

Results of the major Soling regattas

Games

Olympic Games

Pan American Games

Vintage Yachting Games

International ISA Trophies

World Championships

Fleet racing

Match racing (Infanta Cristina)

Masters

Continental Championships

Australian Championships

European Championships

Fleet racing

Match racing

North American Championship

South American Championship

Soling World Trophy

Winners of National Championships

References

 
Sailboat type designs by Jan Herman Linge
One-design sailing classes